You Are the Light is an extended play by Swedish indie pop musician Jens Lekman, released on 17 August 2004 by Secretly Canadian.

Track listing

References

2004 EPs
Jens Lekman EPs
Secretly Canadian EPs